The Z Rink was an indoor roller hockey facility located in Glastonbury, Connecticut (a suburb of Hartford), in the United States. It was the home arena of the Killingworth Guppies, known as America’s Favorite NonProfessional Sports Franchise and for their numerous League Championships.  Also the Connecticut Blaze of the PIHA and Hartford Fire Ants of the American Inline Hockey League.

The rink announced it would close at the end of November 2012, after the building was sold. 

Glastonbury, Connecticut
Indoor ice hockey venues in the United States
Defunct sports venues in Connecticut
Defunct indoor arenas in the United States
Indoor arenas in Connecticut